Andrei Kolesnikov (born February 26, 1989) is a Russian professional ice hockey defenceman who currently plays for Chelmet Chelyabinsk of the Higher Hockey League.

References

External links

1989 births
Living people
HC Vityaz players
Saryarka Karagandy players
Russian ice hockey defencemen
Sportspeople from Barnaul